Released in 2004 by Deep Shag Records, On the Road with Ellison Volume 2 is a collection of humorous and thought provoking moments from the vaults of Harlan Ellison. The CD features a new essay written by Harlan for this release. When Harlan Ellison speaks, no topic is off-limits. This is not Harlan reading his work; it's a collection of interesting observations and stories from his life.

Track listing
You Have Been Warned
The Player In The Bogus Blue Blazer
The "I, Robot" Tragedy
Demented SF Movie Harangue
Quickies Redux
Mailing Labels, Or, How Corporate America Goes Sticky All Over You
Diabetes & The Anti-Christ
Why We Will Never Enjoy The Pleasures Of Atomic Holocaust: A Theory
Reagan's "Enemies" List
How Steve McQueen Saved My Life
Deductive Logic
The Dick
Where There's Smoke
And Now, The Sermon & Soup

References
 Fingerprints on the Sky: The Authorized Harlan Ellison Bibliography, Richmond, T. (2017). Edgeworks Abbey/Subterranean Press.

External links
Deep Shag Records listing for the album
All Music Guide review

2004 live albums
Harlan Ellison albums
Deep Shag Records albums